François Césaire de Mahy (22 July 1830, Saint-Pierre, Réunion – 19 November 1906, Paris) was a French politician.

Sources
https://web.archive.org/web/20090107032223/http://www.ile-bourbon.net/gouverneur/010909mahy.htm
https://web.archive.org/web/20100305154851/http://www.clicanoo.com/article.php3?id_article=97592

1830 births
1906 deaths
People from Saint-Pierre, Réunion
Politicians of Réunion
Opportunist Republicans
French Ministers of Agriculture
Members of the National Assembly (1871)
Members of the 1st Chamber of Deputies of the French Third Republic
Members of the 2nd Chamber of Deputies of the French Third Republic
Members of the 3rd Chamber of Deputies of the French Third Republic
Members of the 4th Chamber of Deputies of the French Third Republic
Members of the 5th Chamber of Deputies of the French Third Republic
Members of the 6th Chamber of Deputies of the French Third Republic
Members of the 7th Chamber of Deputies of the French Third Republic
Members of the 8th Chamber of Deputies of the French Third Republic
Members of the 9th Chamber of Deputies of the French Third Republic
Members of the Ligue de la patrie française